Verticillium zaregamsianum is a fungus often found in lettuce in Japan. It can causes verticillium wilt in some plant species. It produces yellow-pigmented hyphae and microsclerotia, while producing few chlamydospores and with sparse resting mycelium. It is most closely related to V. tricorpus.

References

Further reading
Inderbitzin, Patrik, et al. "Identification and differentiation of Verticillium species and V. longisporum lineages by simplex and multiplex PCR assays." PLoS ONE8.6 (2013): e65990. http://journals.plos.org/plosone/article?id=10.1371/journal.pone.0065990
Stajner, Natasa. "Identification and Differentiation of Verticillium Species with PCR Markers and Sequencing of ITS Region." Plant and Animal Genome XXIII Conference. Plant and Animal Genome.

External links

Fungal plant pathogens and diseases
Fungi described in 2011
Hypocreales incertae sedis